John E. Thurman Jr. (May 6, 1919 – July 27, 1983) was an American politician and World War II veteran, having served in the United States Army. A Democrat, he served in the California State Assembly from 1973 to 1982. Thurman served as chairman of the Agriculture Committee from 1974 to 1982. Prior to his time in the state assembly, he served on the Stanislaus County Board of Supervisors from 1970 to 1972. He died in 1983.

He was married to his wife, Julia, and had three children.

During his time in the legislature, Thurman voted for rape legislation and the "Use A Gun, Go To Prison" rule.

References

United States Army personnel of World War II
1919 births
1983 deaths
20th-century American politicians
Republican Party members of the California State Assembly